Júlio César Campozano and Alejandro González were the defending champions and reached the final, but lost to Jorge Aguilar and Sergio Galdós 4–6, 4–6.

Seeds

Draw

Draw

References
 Main Draw

Visit Panama Cup - Doubles
2013 Doubles